At about 5pm on 6 January 2020, a bomb exploded at a market in Gamboru, Borno State, northeastern Nigeria. The market is located on a bridge which connects Gamboru to Fotokol, Logone-et-Chari, Far North Region, Cameroon. The bombing killed 38 people and injured over 35 others. No group claimed responsibility. Boko Haram often carry out attacks in the region, their insurgency having caused over 35,000 deaths since it began in 2009.

References

2020 murders in Nigeria
2020s in Borno State
2020s massacres in Nigeria
Boko Haram attacks in Borno State
Boko Haram bombings
Improvised explosive device bombings in 2020
Improvised explosive device bombings in Borno State
Islamic terrorist incidents in 2020
January 2020 crimes in Africa
Marketplace attacks in Nigeria
Mass murder in 2020
Mass murder in Borno State
Terrorist incidents in Nigeria in 2020
Gamboru